Osadchuk, Осадчук is a Ukrainian surname. Notable people with the surname include:

Alex Osadchuk (born 1972), Australian water polo player
Bohdan Osadchuk (1920–2011), Ukrainian historian and journalist
Sergei Osadchuk, Russian professional football manager
Andrii Osadchuk, Member of Ukrainian Parliament

See also
 

Ukrainian-language surnames